Rogers Creek may refer to:

Rogers Creek (Current River tributary)
Rogers Creek (Pennsylvania)
Rogers Creek (Lake Erie), a watershed administered by the Long Point Region Conservation Authority, that drains into Lake Erie

See also
 Rogers Brook
 Rodgers Creek, Queensland, Australia